Jerry O. Relph (September 4, 1944December 18, 2020) was an American politician and member of the Minnesota Senate. A Republican, he represented District 14 in central Minnesota from 2017 until his death from COVID-19 complications in 2020. Prior to his death, he attended a superspreader event, along with several other Minnesota Republicans, where attendees did not comply with public health recommendations, such as wearing protective face masks.

Early life, education, and career
Relph was born in Boston, Massachusetts, and attended high school in Ann Arbor, Michigan. He attended Carleton College, graduating in 1966 with a Bachelor of Arts degree, and William Mitchell College of Law, graduating in 1974 with a Juris Doctor.

After graduating from Carleton, Relph enlisted in the Marine Corps, spending 14 months in South Vietnam. After that, he worked for 3M in personnel while attending law school. He later joined a small law firm in St. Charles, Minnesota, specializing in municipal, real estate, business, and tax law. In 1984, Relph moved to St. Cloud, Minnesota and joined the Hughes law firm, specializing in municipal and zoning law. He later joined LakeMaster.

Minnesota Senate
In his first run for public office, Relph was elected to the Minnesota Senate in 2016, defeating Democratic–Farmer–Labor candidate Dan Wolgamott by 141 votes. He ran for reelection in 2020, losing to Democratic–Farmer–Labor candidate Aric Putnam. Putnam declared victory a week following the election, with a lead of 315 votes. Relph requested and paid for a recount, which resulted in a gain of two votes for Putnam and three for Relph. Relph never formally conceded the election.

Political positions

Relph opposed a paid family/sick leave proposal, calling it a "statewide social security system". He opposed universal preschool, calling it a "step to creating cradle to grave control by the government."

In early 2020, Relph expressed concern over COVID-19, arguing the state was inadequately prepared to combat it. He authored legislation, which was signed into law, to provide nearly $2.1 million in aid to fight the pandemic.

Personal life
Relph was married to Colette Relph from 1972 until her death in 1999. They had two children. In 2002, he married Pegi Broker, with whom he had four stepchildren. He lived in St. Cloud.

Death
Relph was one of several Minnesota Republicans who tested positive for COVID-19 during the COVID-19 pandemic in Minnesota after attending an in-person post-election party on November 5, 2020. At the party, there was little compliance with public health recommendations, such as wearing face masks. He was hospitalized in mid-November.

After weeks of hospitalization, Relph died from complications of the virus on December 18. His daughter, angry at the get-together that preceded his illness, asked, "Why are you throwing a party with 100-plus people in the middle of a pandemic?"

References

External links

 Official Senate website
 Official campaign website 

1944 births
2020 deaths
20th-century American lawyers
21st-century American lawyers
21st-century American politicians
Carleton College alumni
Deaths from the COVID-19 pandemic in Minnesota
Military personnel from Massachusetts
Military personnel from Minnesota
Minnesota lawyers
Republican Party Minnesota state senators
Politicians from Boston
Politicians from St. Cloud, Minnesota
United States Marine Corps personnel of the Vietnam War
William Mitchell College of Law alumni